"A Country Boy Can Survive" is a song written and recorded by American musician Hank Williams Jr. The song was released as a single in January 1982 and reached a peak of number 2 on the Billboard Hot Country Singles chart in March 1982. It is considered one of Williams's signature songs even though it never reached number one.

Shortly after 9/11, Williams re-wrote and re-recorded the song with a patriotic theme under the name "America Will Survive"; the rewrite peaked at number 45 on the Billboard country charts.

In early 2007, Williams re-released the original version to commemorate the 25th anniversary of its original release, in addition to creating a music video for it. This re-release peaked at number 45 on the Billboard country charts.

Content
This song was released in January 1982.  It reflects changes to American lifestyle and society that corresponded with rural concerns of the negative impact from increasing urbanization, and exalts the self-reliance of 'country boys'.

The second verse mentions the narrator's relationship with a New York City businessman; despite their differing backgrounds (urban vs. rural) the two had become good friends and exchanged gifts ("he'd send me pictures of the Broadway nights/And I'd send him some homemade wine").  The businessman is "killed by a man with a switchblade knife/for $43 my friend lost his life"; Williams replies that he would like to personally shoot the mugger himself, but not before "(spitting) Beech-Nut in that dude's eyes". (The "America Will Survive" remix has the businessman being a victim of the 9/11 attacks.)

Chart history

Original version

Year-end charts

2001 re-release as "America Will Survive"

2007 re-release for 25th Anniversary

Certifications

Cover versions
Kid Rock recorded a cover of the song, which appeared on the 1993 EP Fire It Up, and as a B-side to his 1993 single "I Am the Bullgod".

Chad Brock version (Y2K version)

In late 1999, Chad Brock and George Jones collaborated with Williams to record a re-written version of the song with a Y2K theme, with lines such as "If the bank machines crash, we'll be just fine." This version peaked at number 30 on the Billboard country charts, and number 75 on the Billboard Hot 100.

Chart positions

References

External links
Official music video by Hank Williams Jr.

1982 singles
1999 singles
2001 singles
2007 singles
Hank Williams Jr. songs
Chad Brock songs
George Jones songs
Songs written by Hank Williams Jr.
Song recordings produced by Jimmy Bowen
Song recordings produced by Buddy Cannon
Song recordings produced by Norro Wilson
Music videos directed by Deaton-Flanigen Productions
Elektra Records singles
Curb Records singles
Warner Records singles
1981 songs